The Collector is a 2009 American horror film written by Patrick Melton and Marcus Dunstan, and directed by Dunstan. It stars Josh Stewart, Michael Reilly Burke, Andrea Roth, Juan Fernandez, Karley Scott Collins, Madeline Zima, and Robert Wisdom. The film follows a man who, in order to pay a debt, decides to rob a house, only to find out somebody with far more sinister intentions has already broken in.

The original script, titled The Midnight Man, was at one point shopped as a spin-off prequel to the Saw franchise, as an origin story for the villain John Kramer / Jigsaw, but the producers opposed the idea and dismissed it, leading to the script getting reworked to an original story.

The Collector was released on July 31, 2009, by Freestyle Releasing. It received generally negative reviews from critics. A sequel, The Collection, was released in 2012.

Plot
Married couple Larry and Gena Wharton return home to find the power is out. They discover a large trunk upstairs, and are horrified by its contents. They are then attacked by an unseen assailant.

Former convict Arkin O'Brien works as a handyman for the Chase family. He is generally well-liked by the Chases, especially the younger daughter Hannah. After work, Arkin meets his wife, whose debt to several loan sharks is due by midnight. To protect her and their daughter, Arkin plans to steal a valuable ruby from the Chase home.

As Arkin attempts to crack the safe, a masked figure locks the door. Michael, the father, appears with several injuries. Mistaking Arkin for the perpetrator, he grabs a golf club. Michael's action triggers a trap that incapacitates him, and the masked man drags Michael into the basement. Arkin attempts to call 911, but the phone is rigged with a spike that punctures his ear. The windows have been boarded up and lined with razors, making escape impossible.

Arkin retreats to the basement, where Michael informs him that his wife Victoria has also been captured, his older daughter Jill is out, and Hannah is hiding somewhere in the house. Michael gives Arkin the combination to the safe, which contains a gun. Arkin finds Victoria and has her distract the intruder in order for him to get to the safe. Arkin grabs the gun (which has no bullets) and pockets the ruby.

While searching for Hannah, he finds a trunk containing a bloodied Larry. Larry explains that the masked man is a "collector" of people; he only collects one person in a household and kills everyone else. Horrified, Arkin flees, while the Collector locks Larry back in the trunk. Back in the basement, Arkin discovers that Michael is now dead. He frees Victoria, who had been tortured. As they make their way out of the basement, Victoria sees Michael's corpse and panics, alerting the Collector, who stabs her several times.

Jill arrives home with her boyfriend Chad. As the two prepare to have sex on the kitchen table, they notice the Collector watching them. Chad attacks him but is killed when he is pushed into a room filled with several bear traps. Jill manages to make a 911 call before being captured. Arkin frees Jill, but she doesn't trust him and reaches for a pair of scissors, only to be killed by a trap. Arkin escapes the house alone, but sees the Collector approaching Hannah. Changing his mind, he reenters the house.

Arkin prepares a trap to kill the Collector, but the trap kills Larry instead. Arkin gets to Hannah, and sends her down a laundry chute to the basement to hide. Before Arkin can do the same, the Collector knocks him out, ties him up and brutally tortures him.

A police officer responding to Jill's 911 call is killed by the Collector's dog. Taking advantage of the distraction, Arkin frees himself and discovers a dead Victoria  and armed explosives in the basement. After killing the Collector's dog with a flaming bucket and trapping the Collector in one of his own traps, Arkin escapes with Hannah.

Seeing approaching police cars, Arkin runs into the road to get their attention and is hit by one of the cars. He sees Hannah carried away by the police. He tells the police that the Collector was an exterminator working at the Chase house. The explosives detonate and destroy the house, but the Collector gets away unharmed. While Arkin is being taken to the hospital, The Collector ambushes the ambulance and kills everyone except Arkin, whom he kidnaps.

In a post-credits scene, the Collector watches film slides on the trunk containing Arkin, who threatens to kill him.

Cast
 Josh Stewart as Arkin O’Brien
 Michael Reilly Burke as Michael Chase
 Andrea Roth as Victoria Chase
 Juan Fernández as The Collector
 Karley Scott Collins as Hannah Chase
 Daniella Alonso as Lisa
 Haley Pullos as Cindy
 William Prael as Larry Wharton
 Diane Ayala Goldner as Gena Wharton
 Alex Feldman as Chad
 Madeline Zima as Jill Chase
 Robert Wisdom as Roy

Production
The Collector was shot in Shreveport, Louisiana in the spring of 2008 over 19 days. It used 16mm film stock.   The final scene (featuring the van in the rain) was part of a reshoot in Los Angeles' Griffith Park.

When Dunstan announced to his producing team he wanted to direct, he set off to make a sizzle reel – a prolonged trailer of the proposed film.  He reunited with many of his friends from Feast (his first writing credit) and employed John Gulager as his cinematographer, and used actors Clu Gulager to play Roy and Tom Gulager as Arkin.  It was this reel that was used to sell the pitch to Dimension Films, who put up the money to produce the film.  Before its release, Dimension chose not to put a P&A budget into the movie and opted to release it direct to DVD.  However, Dimension gave the filmmakers a chance to sell the film.  In the end, Mickey Liddell bought the movie from Dimension. Liddell organized the reshoots and changed the title from The Midnight Man to The Collector.

Release
The Collector was theatrically released by Freestyle Releasing on July 31, 2009, in the United States, and on DVD on April 6, 2010. A rental version was made available February 12, 2010, through Blockbuster Video's Exclusive Line. The DVD includes two deleted scenes, and also an alternative ending which is Arkin leaving after seeing Hannah in the windowthus cutting off the remaining 25 minutes of the film.

Reception

Critical response
Review aggregator Rotten Tomatoes reported that 29% of 74 critics gave the film a positive reviews, with an average rating of 4.12/10. The site's critics consensus reads, "Increasingly tedious displays of gore makes this torture porn home-invasion-horror more programmatic than provocative." On Metacritic, the film has a weighted average score of 29 out of 100, based on 11 critics, indicating "generally unfavorable reviews".

Clay Cane of BET noted that, "You will squirm, but aren't we getting a bit desensitized to these routine torture flicks? It's like seeing a pop songstress get naked for the billionth time – yeah, she's hot, but we have all seen it before." Bloody Disgusting gave the film a 3.5/5 and wrote that The Collector is "a raw, gritty and uncompromising horror film that puts the previous Saw film to shame." The reviewer also believed that the character of the Collector had the potential to become a new horror icon.

Box office
On the opening day, the film opened in 1,325 theaters, grossing $1,325,000. The film has grossed $7,712,114.

Sequels

Speaking about a sequel, Patrick Melton said in an interview:

I didn't think it necessarily would happen because while the movie did well for its budget, it certainly wasn't a blockbuster, but it did well enough that the film's producer, Mickey Liddell, wants to make a sequel and of course wants me and Marcus to be involved again.
So we are seeing if we can work out some sort of a deal for us to write it and for Marcus to direct, but right now it's just in the deal stage. It is a possibility. I couldn't imagine it being made without Marcus directing it."

Shooting on the second film, The Collection, began in October 2010, and the film was released on November 30, 2012. Josh Stewart reprised his role as Arkin.

On May 2, 2019, Josh Stewart tweeted that another sequel titled The Collected, stylized as The Coll3cted, was happening along with a poster.

In April 2021, writers Marcus Dunstan and Patrick Melton admitted that the third film may not happen due to "creative disinterest".

See also
 List of films featuring home invasions

Notes

References

External links
 
 
 
 
 
 

2009 films
2000s horror thriller films
2009 independent films
2000s serial killer films
American horror thriller films
American independent films
American serial killer films
Films set in 2011
Films set in Illinois
Films shot in Alabama
Films shot in Louisiana
Home invasions in film
Torture in films
2009 directorial debut films
2000s English-language films
2000s American films